"Heartbeat" is a song by British band Scouting For Girls and the third single taken from their self-titled debut album. Its physical release was on 7 April 2008 and it peaked at number 10 on the UK Singles Chart and number 17 in Ireland. It was nominated for Best British Single at the 2009 BRIT Awards.

Critical reception
The song was on the 10-song shortlist for Best British Single at the 2009 BRIT Awards. It was voted into the top five songs which would compete for the award. The other nominees were Duffy's "Mercy", Coldplay's "Viva la Vida", Leona Lewis's "Better in Time" and Girls Aloud's "The Promise". "The Promise" eventually took the award.

Music video
In the music video the band is seen playing at a lovers ball in front of young couples. Those who have love (or lust) for others are shown to have beating CGI hearts.

Track listing
UK CD single
 "Heartbeat"
 "A Level Pain"

Charts

Weekly charts

Year-end charts

Certifications

References

2008 singles
2008 songs
Epic Records singles
Scouting for Girls songs
Sony BMG singles